Noma Noha Akugue (born 2 December 2003) is a German female tennis player of Nigerian descent. 

Noha Akugue has a career-high WTA singles ranking of world No. 212, achieved in February 2023, and a best doubles ranking of No. 430, reached in February 2023. She made her WTA Tour main-draw debut at the 2021 Porsche Tennis Grand Prix in Stuttgart, partnering Julia Middendorf in the doubles competition.

Singles performance timeline

Only main-draw results in WTA Tour, Grand Slam tournaments, Billie Jean King Cup and Olympic Games are included in win–loss records.

Current through the 2022 WTA Tour

ITF Circuit finals

Singles: 8 (1 title, 7 runner–ups)

Doubles: 2 (1 title, 1 runner–up)

References

External links
 
 

2003 births
Living people
German female tennis players
People from Stormarn (district)
German sportspeople of Nigerian descent